Gentianothamnus is a monotypic plant genus in the gentian family (Gentianaceae), tribe Exaceae. The sole species is Gentianothamnus madagascariensis. It is endemic to Madagascar.

References 

 Gentian Research Network

Gentianaceae
Endemic flora of Madagascar
Monotypic Gentianales genera
Gentianaceae genera